Brandon Mroz (born December 22, 1990) is an American former competitive figure skater. He is the 2009 U.S. silver medalist and the 2006 & 2007 Junior Grand Prix Final silver medalist. He is the first skater to have completed a quadruple Lutz jump in a sanctioned competition.

Personal life
Brandon Mroz was born in St. Louis, Missouri, one of four brothers. His mother and a brother suffered serious injuries in a car accident. Mroz's mother was at one time a synchronized skater, and his father an ice hockey player.

Mroz has expressed interest in becoming a dentist.

Career

Early career
Mroz began skating at age 3 and a half. He was coached by Shannon Nester and Debbie Howe from 2001 through 2004 and by Doug Leigh and Michelle Leigh in Barrie, Ontario, from 2002 through 2004. In addition to singles skating, he also trained as an ice dancer and tested in that discipline up to silver level in the U.S. Figure Skating testing structure.

In the 2001–02 season, Mroz competed on the juvenile level, the lowest competitive level in the United States. He represented the St. Louis Skating Club in competition. He won his regional competition, the Upper Great Lakes Regional Championship, to qualify at the juvenile level for the 2002 U.S. Junior Championships, where he placed 6th in his qualifying group and went on to place 18th overall.

In the 2002–03 season, Mroz moved up to the intermediate level. He won both the short program and the free skate at his regional competition to win the gold medal overall. By this win he qualified to compete at the intermediate level at the 2003 U.S. Junior Championships, where he placed second in his qualifying group, 16th in the short program, and 7th in the free skate to place 11th overall.

In the 2003–04 season, Mroz moved up to the novice level. At the regional championship, the first qualifying competition for the U.S. Figure Skating Championships, Mroz won the short program and the free skate to win the gold medal overall. This win qualified him for the 2004 Midwestern Sectional Championships, the second and final qualifying competition for the national championships. At Sectionals, Mroz placed fourth in the short program and second in the free skate to win the silver medal overall. With this medal he qualified for the 2004 U.S. Championships at the novice level. At Nationals, Mroz placed 7th in the short program and the free skate to place 7th overall. Following the event, Mroz competed at the 2004 Copenhagen Trophy, where he won the novice men's competition after winning both segments of the competition

In the 2004–05 season, Mroz remained on the novice level. At his regional championships, he placed second in the short program and in the free skate to win the silver medal overall. This medal qualified him for the Midwestern Sectional Championships where he placed 8th in the short program and 5th in the free skate to place 6th overall. Due to this placement, he did not qualify for the 2005 U.S. Championships.

In 2005, Mroz moved to Colorado Springs, Colorado, where he joined Tom Zakrajsek. In the 2005–06 season, he remained on the novice level for a third and final season. He had moved to Colorado Springs, Colorado for his training, and represented the Broadmoor Skating Club there. A switch of club meant a change of region. Competing at the Southwestern Regional Championship, Mroz won the short program and the free skate to win the gold medal overall. This win qualified him for the 2006 Midwestern Sectionals where Mroz competed for the first time under the ISU Judging System. He won the short program and placed second in the free skate to win the gold medal overall, ahead of Eliot Halverson. This win qualified him, again, for the 2006 U.S. Championships.

At the 2006 U.S. Championships, Mroz won the short program by a point margin of 1.48. He placed third in the free skate, 5.25 points behind the leader in that segment. Mroz won the silver medal overall, placing 2.26 points behind champion Eliot Halverson and 2.94 points ahead of bronze medalist Curran Oi. In his free skate, Mroz landed all the triples except for the Axel, including a triple lutz-triple toe combination.

Junior career
Mroz was assigned to the 2006 Triglav Trophy. Competing on the junior level for the first time in his career, Mroz won both the short and free programs to win the gold medal overall, winning the title by 25.84 points ahead of silver medalist Jamie Forsythe.

In the 2006–07 season, Mroz moved up to the Junior level on the national level, and he debuted on the ISU Junior Grand Prix circuit. At his first Junior Grand Prix event, the event in Mexico City, Mexico, Mroz placed 11th in the short program and then won the free skate to take the silver medal overall, placing 7.53 points behind champion Kevin Reynolds and 0.16 points head of bronze medalist Daisuke Murakami. At Mroz's second event, the Junior Grand Prix event in Taipei City, Taiwan, Mroz won the short program and placed second in the free skate to win the gold medal overall, placing 7.73 points ahead of silver medalist Reynolds.

These two medals qualified Mroz for the Junior Grand Prix Final, to which he was the fourth-ranked qualifier overall. By qualifying for the event, Mroz also earned a bye to the national championships and so did not need to compete at qualifying events. At the JGP Final, Mroz placed 5th in the short program and 2nd in the free skate. He won the silver medal overall, placing 20.07 points behind champion Stephen Carriere and 6.76 ahead of bronze medalist Reynolds.

Mroz then competed at the 2007 U.S. Championships. Mroz placed second in the short program and third in the free skate. He won the silver medal overall, placing 9.23 points behind champion Eliot Halverson and 0.62 points ahead of bronze medalist Austin Kanallakan This was the second consecutive year in which Halverson and Mroz had won gold and silver at the national championships.

Mroz was subsequently placed on the team for the 2007 World Junior Championships where he placed 7th in the short program and 2nd in the free skate to place 4th overall, finishing exactly two points behind bronze medalist Sergei Voronov and 0.08 points ahead of 5th-place finisher Kevin Reynolds

In the 2007–08 season, Mroz remained on the Junior level both nationally and internationally. He competed for the second consecutive season on the Junior Grand Prix. At his first event, the 2007–08 ISU Junior Grand Prix event in Vienna, Austria, he placed fourth in the short program and won the free skate to win the gold medal overall, placing 1.69 points ahead of silver medalist Guan Jinlin. At his second event in Chemnitz, Germany, he again placed 4th in the short program and won the free skate to win the gold medal overall, this time with a 3.30 margin of victory over silver medalist Michal Březina.

These two medals qualified Mroz for the Junior Grand Prix Final, for which he was the highest-ranked qualifier. At the JGP Final, Mroz placed second in both segments of the competition to win the silver medal overall, placing 15.86 points behind champion Adam Rippon and 5.30 points ahead of bronze medalist Armin Mahbanoozadeh. This was the first time that the United States had swept the JGP Final men's podium.

By qualifying for the JGP Final, Mroz received a bye to the 2008 U.S. Championships. At Nationals, Mroz competed for the second time on the junior level. He placed 3rd in the short program and 2nd in the free skate to win the silver medal overall, 10.13 points behind champion Rippon. He was subsequently placed on the team to the 2008 World Junior Championships where he placed 3rd in the short program after landing a 3A-3T combination. He placed 5th in the free skate to place 4th overall, placing 3.40 points behind bronze medalist Guan Jinlin.

Senior career

 
In the 2008–09 season, Mroz moved up to the Senior level both nationally and internationally. He debuted on the Grand Prix circuit. At his first event, the 2008 Skate Canada International, he placed 6th in the short program and 7th in the free skate to place 7th overall. During his free skate, he was credited with a 4T. Mroz went on to compete at the 2008 Trophée Eric Bompard, his second Grand Prix event. He placed 6th in the short program and 5th in the free skate to place 5th overall.

Due to the timing of his Grand Prix events, Mroz had a bye to the 2009 U.S. Championships. At Nationals, Mroz placed 4th in the short program after being credited with landing a 3A as his required element axel jump and a 3Lz-3T as his combination jump. He placed 2nd in the free skate, in which he was credited with landing a 4T  and eight triples, including a 3Lz-3T combination. He won the silver medal overall, placing 12.19 points behind champion and training-mate Jeremy Abbott and 0.60 points ahead of Evan Lysacek.

Following the national championships, Mroz was assigned to the 2009 Four Continents Championships and the 2009 World Championships. At Four Continents, Mroz placed 5th in the short program after landing a 3A, 3F, and 3Lz-3T combination. In the free skate, Mroz placed 9th  after landing a 4T, but making errors on several other jumps, including his 3A. He placed 8th overall.

In his debut at the senior World Championships, Mroz skated a strong short program to place 8th in that segment of the competition. He placed 13th in the free skate to finish 9th overall. His placement, combined with that of World Champion Evan Lysacek, earned the United States the maximum three entries to the 2010 Winter Olympics.

Mroz won his first senior Grand Prix medal, silver, at 2010 Cup of China. He followed it up with a bronze medal at 2010 Trophée Eric Bompard. Competing with a dislocated shoulder, he placed 7th at the 2011 U.S. Championships.

In August 2011, Mroz began working on other types of quads – 4Lo, 4F, and 4Lz. He landed 4Lz successfully on September 16, 2011, in the short program at the 2011 Colorado Springs Invitational. The International Skating Union subsequently ratified the jump as the first successful 4Lz landed in a sanctioned competition. His assigned 2011–12 Grand Prix events are 2011 NHK Trophy and 2011 Cup of Russia. Mroz became the first skater to land the 4Lz in an international competition on November 12 in the short program at NHK Trophy.

After ending his competitive career, Mroz began skating in Willy Bietak's ice shows on Royal Caribbean cruise ships.

Programs

Competitive highlights
GP: Grand Prix; JGP: Junior Grand Prix

Senior results

Pre-2008 results

References

External links

 
 Brandon Mroz at the United States Olympic Committee

American male single skaters
1990 births
Living people
Sportspeople from St. Louis